Disintegrin and metalloproteinase domain-containing protein 23 is a non-catalytic protein that in humans is encoded by the ADAM23 gene. It is a member of the ADAM family of extracellular matrix metalloproteinases.

Function 

This gene encodes a member of the ADAM (a disintegrin and metalloprotease domain) family. Members of this family are membrane-anchored proteins structurally related to snake venom disintegrins, and have been implicated in a variety of biological processes involving cell-cell and cell-matrix interactions, including fertilization, muscle development, and neurogenesis. This gene is highly expressed in the brain and may function as an integrin ligand in the brain.

References

Further reading

External links 
 The MEROPS online database for peptidases and their inhibitors: M12.979
 

Proteases
Human proteins
EC 3.4.24